Lothar Beckert (26 July 1931 – 28 April 2017) was a German long-distance runner. He competed in the marathon at the 1956 Summer Olympics and the 1960 Summer Olympics.

References

External links
 

1931 births
2017 deaths
Athletes (track and field) at the 1956 Summer Olympics
Athletes (track and field) at the 1960 Summer Olympics
German male long-distance runners
German male marathon runners
Olympic athletes of the United Team of Germany
Sportspeople from Saxony